Los Valientes del Mundo Nuevo (The Braves of the New World) is the second live album by the lo-fi garage rock band Black Lips. This recording is purportedly from a live show performed in Tijuana, Mexico. But this claim's validity has frequently been called into question. Many of the songs featured appeared on the band's previous studio album, Let It Bloom.

Track listing
 "M.I.A." – 3:53
 "Boomerang" – 2:27
 "Sea of Blasphemy" – 2:14
 "Stranger" – 2:33
 "Not a Problem" – 3:14
 "Hippie, Hippie, Hoorah" – 2:53
 "Boone" – 2:07
 "Everybody's Doing It" – 3:00
 "Fairy Stories" – 1:52
 "Dirty Hands" – 2:36
 "Buried Alive" – 2:24
 "Juvenile" – 8:14
 [Hidden Track] "Lion with Wings" – 2:52

References

Black Lips albums
2007 live albums